Mary Dickerson may refer to:

Mary Augusta Dickerson (also known as Mary Dickerson Donahey; 1876–1962), American author of children's books and cookbooks. 
Mary Cynthia Dickerson (1866–1923), American herpetologist
Mary Evelyn Parker (born Mary Evelyn Dickerson; 1920–2015), Louisiana politician
Mary H. Dickerson (1830–1914), African American businesswoman and clubwoman
Mary Lou Dickerson (born 1946), member of the Washington House of Representatives

See also
Mary Dickinson (disambiguation)